Orange Park may refer to:
Orange Park, Florida, a town in Clay County, Florida
Orange Park Elementary School
Orange Park High School
Orange Park Negro Elementary School
Orange Park Christian Academy
Orange Park Mall
Orange Park (New Jersey), a county park in Orange, New Jersey

See also
Orange Park Acres, California